Lignumvitae Key is an island in the upper Florida Keys.

It is located due north of, and less than one mile from the easternmost tip of Lower Matecumbe Key.

This dark green island is covered in rare tropical hardwoods such as the island's namesake, Holywood Lignum-vitae (Guaiacum sanctum).

History
Records of the ownership of Lignumvitae Key go back to 1843, including the years of 1919-1953 when the Matheson family of Miami owned the island. The island was purchased by Dr. Edwin C. Lunsford, Sr. and two other investors in 1953.  Charlotte and Russell Neidhauk lived on the island and served as caretakers during this period.  The coral bedrock house they lived in still stands today.  On March 2, 1971, Lignum Vitae and nearby Shell Keys were purchased by the State of Florida, and Lignum Vitae became Lignumvitae Key State Botanical Park.

The key is called Cayo de la Leña (Spanish for "Firewood Key") on an unsigned Spanish chart of 1760.

References

External links

 History of the Key

Hills of Florida
Islands of Monroe County, Florida
Islands of the Florida Keys
Islands of Florida